Chariesthes rubra is a species of beetle in the family Cerambycidae. It was described by Hintz in 1912, originally under the genus Apheniastus. It is known from Cameroon and the Central African Republic.

References

Chariesthes
Beetles described in 1912